Maideria falipoui is a long-snouted brachythoracid arthrodire placoderm from the Lower Middle Givetian epoch of Middle Devonian South Morocco, in what is now the Anti-Atlas Mountains.  Although M. falipoui  superficially resembles Buchanosteus, albeit with an elongated snout or rostrum, M. falipoui is considered to be a basal member of the group Coccosteina, thus, it has not yet been given any familial ranking.

References

Arthrodira enigmatic taxa
Placoderms of Africa
Fossil taxa described in 1995
Arthrodire genera